Tagubanhan Island is a wooded island in northeastern Iloilo, Philippines. It is part of the municipality of Concepcion.

Location and geography 

Part of the Concepcion Islands, Tagubanhan is southwest of Igbon Island and northwest of Anauayan Island. To the northwest of Tagubanhan is Mount Apiton, and the channel between Tagubanhan and Panay is known as the Apiton Pass.

See also 

 List of islands in the Philippines

References

Sources

External links
 Tagubanhan Island at OpenStreetMap

Islands of Iloilo